Daudet is a given name and surname. Notable people with the name include:

People with the surname
 Alphonse Daudet (1840–1897), French novelist
 Célimène Daudet (born 1977), French classical pianist
 Ernest Daudet (1837–1921), French journalist, novelist and historian
 François Daudet (born 1965), French classical pianist
 Joris Daudet (born 1991), French cyclist
 Julia Daudet (1844–1940), French writer, poet and journalist
 Léon Daudet (1867–1942), French journalist, writer, an active Orléanist, and a member of the Académie Goncourt (son of Alphonse Daudet)
 Lucien Daudet (1878–1946), French novelist, painter, and friend of Marcel Proust (son of Alphonse Daudet)

People with the given name
 Daudet N'Dongala (born 1944), French footballer

See also
 Prix Jean Ferré, a French literary prize formerly known as the Daudet Prize